Kashidar (also Romanized as Kāshīdār and Kashīdār) is a village in Cheshmeh Saran Rural District, Cheshmeh Saran District, Azadshahr County, Golestan Province, Iran. At the 2006 census, its population was 1,433, in 362 families.

References 

Populated places in Azadshahr County